Pauline Cope (born 16 February 1969), whose married name is Pauline Cope-Boanas, is an English former football goalkeeper. She won 60 caps for the England women's national football team between her debut in 1995 and retirement from international football in 2004. Cope was England's first choice goalkeeper at the 1995 FIFA Women's World Cup and UEFA Women's Euro 2001. Ted Copeland, England's coach at the former competition, described Cope as the best female goalkeeper in the world.

Having started playing with Millwall Lionesses in her native South London, Cope remained until 1998. Her time at the club was interspersed with two separate spells with Arsenal and a season out of football in 1993–94. She moved on to Croydon, who came under the auspices of Charlton Athletic in 2000. Cope finished her club career playing for Charlton under the management of partner and future husband Keith Boanas, retiring in 2006. A League champion on three occasions, Cope won the FA Women's Cup four times and was a losing finalist twice.

Club career
At club level Cope won the FA Women's Cup with Millwall Lionesses, Arsenal and Croydon and in May 2004 played in goal for Charlton in their 3–0 final defeat against Arsenal.

In the 2000 FA Women's Cup Final at Bramall Lane, Cope saved a penalty kick from her England teammate Karen Walker as Croydon beat Doncaster Belles 2–1. As Croydon celebrated their win, Cope revealed a T-shirt bearing the legend: "I love my Keith." The following week Croydon beat Aston Villa 6–0 to win the league and clinch a domestic double.

In 2003 Cope was employed as a full-time girls' development officer with Charlton Athletic. The position allowed her to improve the way she trained: "I'm in the best position in women's football in Europe. Maybe even the world, because I get to train day-in day-out with Dean Kiely, who's one of the best keepers around." She played in Charlton's 3–0 defeat to full-time professional Fulham in the 2003 FA Women's Cup Final.

A fortnight after helping Charlton beat Arsenal 2–1 in the 2006 Premier League Cup final, 37-year-old Cope produced a vintage performance in the FA Women's Cup semi final but Charlton lost 2–1 to the same opponents. Having watched his side score a late winner in extra time, Arsenal manager Vic Akers declared: "Pauline Cope was absolutely outstanding." Cope then retired from club football at the end of the 2005–06 season. After her final game, a 1–0 defeat at Everton which consigned Charlton to third place in the table, club captain Casey Stoney said of Cope: "If I'm honest I don't think she can be replaced. She's the best goalkeeper I've ever seen."

International career
Cope played 60 times for the senior England women's national football team, making her debut in a 1–1 friendly draw with Italy in Florence on 26 January 1995. By the time of the 1995 FIFA Women's World Cup, held in Sweden during June 1995, she had displaced former Millwall teammate Lesley Higgs as England's first choice goalkeeper. At the tournament it was reported that Cope's performances in comprehensive defeats by Norway and Germany had averted "hideous embarrassment" for the outmatched English team. National coach Ted Copeland described her as "the best keeper in the world."

In October 2000, goalkeeping understudy Rachel Brown played in the UEFA Women's Euro 2001 qualification play-off in Ukraine when Cope was struck down with a stomach complaint on the morning of the game. Cope was restored to the team for the final tournament and played in all three games as England went out in the group stage.

In April 2004 Cope unexpectedly retired from international football. In 2008, she was inducted into the English Football Hall of Fame.

Coaching career
In September 2015 Cope joined Gillingham Ladies as a goalkeeper coach.

Personal life
Cope is the wife of former Estonia women's team coach Keith Boanas and stepmother to Sonny and Kari Boanas. Despite her long association with Millwall's female section, Cope remains a West Ham United supporter.

Honours
 FA Women's Premier League National Division: 3
1994–95, 1998–99, 1999–00
FA Women's Cup: 4
1994–95, 1996–97, 1999–00, 2004–05
Women's League Cup: 4
1993–94, 1996–97, 2003–04, 2005–06

References

External links
 

Living people
1969 births
English women's footballers
English Football Hall of Fame inductees
England women's international footballers
Millwall Lionesses L.F.C. players
Arsenal W.F.C. players
Charlton Athletic W.F.C. players
FA Women's National League players
1995 FIFA Women's World Cup players
Women's association football goalkeepers